Equal Rights Party may refer to:

Equal Rights Party (Canada)
Equal Rights (Latvia)
Liberia Equal Rights Party
Equal Rights Party (United States) (disambiguation)

See also
Equal rights (disambiguation)